The Harni are a Muslim community found in the province of Punjab, Pakistan. and also found in Punjab, India.

References

Further reading

Social groups of Punjab, Pakistan
Punjabi tribes